Duck Lake is a town in the boreal forest of central Saskatchewan, Canada. Immediately to the north of Duck Lake is the south block of the Nisbet Provincial Forest.

The First Nations people are Cree and the band government of the Beardy's and Okemasis' Cree Nation is located here.

Duck Lake was home to one of the last operating schools in the Canadian Indian residential school system, the St. Michael's Indian Residential School (Duck Lake Indian Residential School), which closed in 1996. The disruption in the transmission of Cree language, culture, family systems and policy caused by the St. Michael’s Residential school created immense trauma and suffering through the generations of children and youth today who continue to seek justice by reclaiming their identity, culture, and language while supporting the survivors.

History
Duck Lake was one of the five Southbranch Settlements settled by French speaking Métis from Manitoba in the 1860s and 1870s. A Roman Catholic Mission was established in Duck Lake in 1874 by Father André O.M.I. and by 1888 the village had a school, a post office (called Stobart), a flour mill (gristmill) and a trading post. From 1882 to 1905 Duck Lake was within the District of Saskatchewan, one of several districts of the Northwest Territories.
 
In 1885, Duck Lake was the site of the Battle of Duck Lake, a conflict between Métis warriors and the Government of Canada, at the start of the North-West Rebellion. At Duck Lake, the Prince Albert Trail, which ran from Regina to Prince Albert, crossed the Carlton Trail and it marked the halfway point between the Métis headquarters at Batoche and the North-West Mounted Police at Fort Carlton.

Historic Carpenter Gothic style All Saints Anglican Church built in 1896 is a municipal heritage site. Its historic cemetery contains the graves of some of those who fought in the Battle of Duck Lake as well as those of other pioneers of the community.

The 1973 western Alien Thunder was partially filmed here.

Demographics 

Notable people
Gabriel Dumont - Leader of Métis forces in the North-West Rebellion 1885.

See also
History of the Northwest Territories

References

Further reading
 Barnholden, Michael. (2009). Circumstances Alter Photographs: Captain James Peters' Reports from the War of 1885. Vancouver, BC: Talonbooks. .

External links

Duck Lake No. 463, Saskatchewan
Towns in Saskatchewan
Hudson's Bay Company trading posts
Division No. 15, Saskatchewan